Mariam Koné (born April 1987 in Kati, Mali) is a Malian singer and music teacher and a member of the supergroup Les Amazones d'Afrique.

Koné has studied law, which is a calling in her family, but she was swept away by music. In her teens, she joined the hip hop group Pacifique in her home town, releasing two albums with them. Later she studied music in the Bamako Conservatory, from which she graduated in 2006. She now teaches herself in this school.

Koné's first solo album Dakan was released in 2013. Its style is soft flowing traditional African pop, with dub influences and electric instrumentation. It was produced by the Irishman Liam Farrell a.k.a. Doctor L.

Koné was invited to Les Amazones d'Afrique by Pamela Badjoko, originally from Gabon but now residing in Mali. Koné was drawn to the group by the fact that it tries to further the cause of local women, opposing all kinds of violence against women, and especially female genital mutilation, which Koné herself has experienced, like almost 90% of Malian women.

Discography
Dakan (2013).

References

21st-century Malian women singers
1987 births
Living people